Phuwiangvenator ("hunter of Phu Wiang") is a genus of 6 meter long megaraptoran theropod that lived during the Early Cretaceous period in what is now Thailand. It contains a single species, P. yaemniyomi, recovered from the Sao Khua Formation.

Discovery and naming
The holotype was first found in 1993, before being named in 2019. The holotype specimen consists of a partial skeleton consisting of a dorsal vertebra, three fused sacral vertebrae, right metacarpal II, right manual phalanges and unguals, right and left tibiae, left astragalocalcaneum, left metatarsal I, right metatarsals II–IV, right pedal phalanges and unguals, with a referred specimen including an atlantal intercentrum and right astragalocalcaneum which were found together. In the phylogenetic analyses it was found to be the basalmost megaraptoran.
Additional materials belonging to the holotype were described in 2021.

Paleobiology

Paleopathology 
The holotype specimen of Phuwiangvenator has a greenstick fracture to one metatarsal, caused by a traumatic event. The result of an injury that was caused by fighting, collision with a hard object or fall, the pathology occurred when the animal was an adolescent, and healed in a distorted form as the theropod matured.

References 

Megaraptorans
Barremian life
Early Cretaceous dinosaurs of Asia
Cretaceous Thailand
Fossils of Thailand
Fossil taxa described in 2019